

This is a list of the National Register of Historic Places listings in Contra Costa County, California.

This is intended to be a complete list of the properties and districts on the National Register of Historic Places in Contra Costa County, California, United States. Latitude and longitude coordinates are provided for many National Register properties and districts; these locations may be seen together in an online map.

There are 49 properties and districts listed on the National Register in the county, including 1 National Historic Landmark.

Current listings

First property listed under the Multiple Property Submission "Historic Resources of Martinez, California" also accepted to the National Register of Historic Places April 2015.

|}

See also

List of National Historic Landmarks in California
National Register of Historic Places listings in California
California Historical Landmarks in Contra Costa County, California

References

Contra Costa
San Francisco Bay Area-related lists